The BMW 801 was a powerful German  air-cooled 14-cylinder-radial aircraft engine built by BMW and used in a number of German Luftwaffe aircraft of World War II. Production versions of the twin-row engine generated between 1,560 and 2,000 PS (1,540–1,970 hp, or 1,150–1,470 kW). It was the most produced radial engine of Germany in World War II with more than 61,000 built.

The 801 was originally intended to replace existing radial types in German transport and utility aircraft. At the time, it was widely agreed among European designers that an inline engine was a requirement for high performance designs due to its smaller frontal area and resulting lower drag. Kurt Tank successfully fitted a BMW 801 to a new fighter design he was working on, and as a result the 801 became best known as the power plant for the famous Focke-Wulf Fw 190. The BMW 801 radial also pioneered the use of what would today be designated an engine control unit: its Kommandogerät engine management system took over the operation of several aviation engine management control parameters of the era, allowing proper operation of the engine with just one throttle lever.

Design and development

Precursor design
In the 1930s, BMW took out a license to build the Pratt & Whitney Hornet engines. By the mid-30s they had introduced an improved version, the BMW 132. The BMW 132 was widely used, most notably on the Junkers Ju 52, which it powered for much of that design's lifetime.

In 1935 the RLM funded prototypes of two much larger radial designs, one from Bramo, the Bramo 329, and another from BMW, the BMW 139. BMW's design used many components from the BMW 132 to create a two-row engine with 14 cylinders, supplying 1,550 PS (1,529 hp, 1,140 kW). After BMW bought Bramo in 1939 both projects were merged into the BMW 801, learning from the problems encountered in both projects.

The BMW 139 was originally intended to be used in roles similar to those of the other German radials, namely bombers and transport aircraft, but midway through the program the Focke-Wulf firm's chief designer, Kurt Tank suggested it for use in the Focke-Wulf Fw 190 fighter project. Radial engines were rare in European designs as they were considered to have too large a frontal area for good streamlining and would not be suitable for high speed aircraft. They were most popular on naval aircraft, where their easier maintenance and improved reliability were highly valued. Efforts to improve these designs led to new  cowling designs that reduced the concerns about drag. Tank felt that attention to detail could result in a streamlined radial that would not suffer undue drag, and would be competitive with inlines.

The main concern was providing cooling air over the cylinder heads, which generally required a very large opening at the front of the aircraft. Tank's solution for the BMW 139 was to use an engine-driven fan behind an oversized, flow-through hollow prop-spinner open at the extreme front, blowing air past the engine cylinders, with some of it being drawn through S-shaped ducts over a radiator for oil cooling. However this system proved almost impossible to operate properly with the BMW 139; early prototypes of the Fw 190 demonstrated terrible cooling problems. Although the problems appeared to be fixable, since the engine was already fairly dated in terms of design, in 1938 BMW proposed an entirely new engine designed specifically for fan-cooling that could be brought to production quickly.

801 emerges

The new design was given the name BMW 801 after BMW was given a new block of "109-800" engine numbers by the RLM to use after their merger with Bramo. The 801 retained the 139's older-style single-valve intake and exhaust, while most in-line engines of the era had moved to either three (as Junkers had done) or four valves per cylinder, or in British use for their own radials, sleeve valves. Several minor advances were worked into the design, including the use of sodium-cooled valves and a direct fuel injection system, manufactured by Friedrich Deckel AG of Munich.

The supercharger was rather basic in the early models, using a single-stage two-speed design directly geared to the engine (unlike the DB 601's hydraulically clutched version) which led to rather limited altitude performance, in keeping with its intended medium-altitude usage. One key advancement for the 801 was the Kommandogerät (command-device), a mechanical-hydraulic unit that automatically adjusted engine fuel flow, propeller pitch, supercharger setting, mixture and ignition timing in response to a single throttle lever, dramatically simplifying engine control. The Kommandogerät could be considered to be a precursor to the engine control units used for many vehicles' internal combustion engines of the late 20th and early 21st centuries.

It also maximized the use of positive air pressure to aid cooling of cylinders, heads, and other internal parts.

801A and 801B 
The first BMW 801As ran in April 1939, only six months after starting work on the design, with production commencing in 1940. The 801B was to be identical to the 801A except for the gearbox, which reversed the direction of the propeller rotation to counterclockwise as seen from behind the engine. The A and B models were intended to be used in pairs on twin-engine designs, cancelling out net torque and making the plane easier to handle. There is no evidence the 801B ever left the prototype stage. The BMW 801A/B engines delivered 1,560 PS (1,539 hp, 1,147 kW) for takeoff. Major applications of the 801A/L engines include multiple variants of the Junkers Ju 88 and Dornier Do 217.

801C and 801L 
The BMW 801C was developed for use in single- or multi-engined fighters and included a new hydraulic prop control and various changes intended to improve cooling, including cooling "gills" on the cowling behind the engine in place of the original slots. The 801C was almost exclusively used in early variants of the Focke-Wulf Fw 190A. The BMW 801L was an A model with the hydraulic prop control mechanism introduced with the 801C engine. The C and L models delivered the same power as the original A model.

801D-2 and 801G-2 

The 801C was replaced with the BMW 801 D-2 series engines in early 1942, which ran on C2/C3 100 octane fuel instead of the A/B/C/L's B4 87 octane, boosting takeoff power to 1,700 PS (1,677 hp, 1,250 kW). The BMW 801G-2 and H-2 models were D-2 engines modified for use in bomber roles with lower gear ratios for driving larger propellers, clockwise and counterclockwise respectively. As with the 801B engine design, however, the 801H-2 engine did not leave the prototype stage.

The D-2 models were tested with a system for injecting a 50–50 water-methanol mixture known as MW50 into the supercharger primarily for its anti-detonation effect, allowing the use of increased boost pressures. Secondary effects were cooling of the engine and charge cooling. Some performance was gained, but at the cost of engine service life. This was replaced by a system that injected fuel instead of MW50, known as C3-injection, and this was used until 1944. The serious fuel shortage in 1944 forced installation of MW50 instead of C3-injection. With MW50 boosting turned on, takeoff power increased to 2,000 PS (1,470 kW), the C3-injection was initially only permitted for low altitude use and increased take-off power to 1,870 PS. Later C3-injection systems were permitted for low-to-medium altitude use and raised take-off power to more than 1,900 PS.

Supercharger development 
With the engine being used in higher-altitude fighter roles, a number of attempts were made to address the limited performance of the original supercharger. The BMW 801E was a modification of the D-2 using different gear ratios, of 6:1 at low speed and 8.3:1 at high speed, that tuned the supercharger for higher altitudes. Although takeoff power was unaffected, cruise power increased over 100 hp (75 kW) and "high power" modes for climb at nearly 1,500 to 1,650 PS; and combat were likewise improved by up to 150 hp (110 kW).

In spite of these improvements, the E model was not widely used. Instead, continued improvements to the basic E model led to the BMW 801F, which dramatically improved performance across the board, with takeoff power increasing to 2,400 hp (1,790 kW), making the 801 the only German aviation engine of an existing type that had a producible subtype that could exceed 1,500 kW from a proven military aircraft powerplant.  It was planned to use the F on all late-model Fw 190s, but the war ended before production started.

Importance of continued development

BMW had been required to create priorities for the 14-cylinder production 801 radial, the 18-cylinder BMW 802 and liquid-cooled 28-cylinder BMW 803 radial engines.

The first priority was for the 801 to be developed "to its limits", with the second priority the 802's design and prototype construction, and lastly the complex 803 four-row radial only receiving attention to its design-development.

By contrast, Allied equivalents such as the American Wright Twin Cyclone, and the Soviet Shvetsov ASh-82 radials never needed to be developed beyond 1,500 kW as these nations possessed larger-displacement 18-cylinder radial aviation engines capable of more power.

Turbocharger development 

As just one result of the highest level of priority given to the successful 801 design's further development, a number of attempts were made to use turbochargers on the BMW 801 series as well.

The turbocharger was fitted behind the engine at a 30° forward tilt off a vertical axis, possessed hollow turbine blades in the exhaust section, and in a photo from Flight magazine, appears to have intercooler units fitted around the inner circumference of the rear cowl, just behind the rear row of cylinders. 

Not many of these engines ever entered production due to high costs, and the various high-altitude designs based on them were forced to turn to other engines, typically the Junkers Jumo 213.

Surviving and operational examples 

A sizable number of BMW 801s exist in museums, some on display by themselves, with some 20 of them associated with surviving examples of the Focke-Wulf Fw 190s that they powered in World War II.  The first original Fw 190 to be restored to flight condition in the 21st century is the Fw 190A-5 discovered near St. Petersburg, Russia in 1989, bearing Werknummer 151 227 and formerly serving with JG 54, was restored to flight condition along with its original BMW 801 powerplant. As of 2011, it is once again airworthy and located in Seattle, Washington, USA. The sole surviving Ju 388, in the hands of the Udvar-Hazy Center of the Smithsonian, has a pair of complete BMW 801J turbocharged engines still in its nacelles.

There is an 801-ML (801L) on display mounted in a Dornier 217 nacelle, essentially a complete surviving Motoranlage unitized powerplant, at the New England Air Museum, Bradley International Airport, Windsor Locks, CT. Likewise, the Ju 88R-1 night fighter at the
Royal Air Force Museum London (see photo above) also has unitized BMW 801 radials installed.

Description
The 801 was a radial engine with two rows of seven cylinders. The unit (including mounts) weighed from 1,010 to 1,250 kg and was about 1.29 m (51 in) across, depending on the model.

The BMW 801 was cooled by forced air with the cooling fan made from a magnesium alloy (probably Elektron), 10-bladed in the initial models, but 12-bladed in most engines. The fan rotated at 1.72 times the crankshaft speed (3.17 times the propeller speed). Air from the fan was blown into the center of the engine in front of the propeller gearing housing, and the shape of the housing and the engine itself carried the air to the outside of the cowling and across the cylinders. A set of slots or gills at the rear of the cowling allowed the hot air to escape. This provided effective cooling although at the cost of about 70 PS (69 hp, 51.5 kW) required to drive the fan when the aircraft was at low speed. Above , the fan absorbed little power directly as the vacuum effect of the airflow past the air exits provided the needed flow.

The 801 used a relatively complex system, integral to the BMW-designed, matching forward cowling system, to cool the lubricating oil. A ring-shaped oil cooler core was built into the BMW-provided forward cowl, just behind the fan. The outer portion of the oil cooler's core was in contact with the main cowling's sheetmetal, to possibly act as a heat sink. Comprising the BMW-designed forward cowl, in front of the oil cooler was a ring of metal with a C-shaped cross-section, with the outer lip lying just outside the rim of the cowl, and the inner side on the inside of the oil cooler core. Together, the metal ring and cowling formed an S-shaped airflow path, with the oil cooler's core contained between them. Airflow past the gap between the cowl and outer lip of the metal ring produced a vacuum effect that pulled air from the front of the engine outward and forward within the cowl's frontmost inner area just behind the fan, flowing forward across the oil cooler core in a separate airflow path from the rearwards-direction flow that cooled the engine's cylinders, just to provide cooling for the 801's oil. The rate of cooling airflow over the core could be controlled by moving the metal ring slightly forward or aft in order to open or close the gap.

The reasons for this complex system were threefold. One was to eliminate any extra aerodynamic drag that a protruding oil cooler would produce, in this case eliminating the extra drag factor by enclosing it within the engine's forward cowling. The second was to warm the air before it flowed to the oil cooler's circular-shaped core to aid warming the oil during starting. Finally, by placing the oil cooler behind the fan, cooling was provided even while the aircraft was parked. The downside to this design was that the oil cooler was in an extremely vulnerable location, and the metal ring was increasingly armoured as the war progressed.

Engine mounting formats

The design of the BMW 801's cowling was key to its proper cooling, which BMW designed and built themselves and supplied with the engine. The design evolved throughout the war, including an extension to the engine mounts that allowed for larger cooling gills. This factory-supplied cowling also improved the simplicity of engine replacement in the field in more completely "unitizing" a BMW 801 radial engine, with as many of its auxiliary systems as possible being simultaneously replaceable with the engine itself, as opposed to opening or removing a "separate" cowling attached to the fuselage of the aircraft.

Engines were typically delivered from BMW complete in their cowling, ready to be bolted to the front of the aircraft or nacelle, since 1942 as Motoranlage (M) and 1944/1945 as Triebwerksanlage (T). The Motoranlage was the original form of the interchangeable Kraftei, or "power-egg", unitized powerplant installation concept used in many German wartime aircraft.  It was most often used with twin and multi-engined designs, with some need for external add-ons. The more comprehensive Triebwerksanlage format for unitization consolidated more of the engine's required accessory systems beyond what the earlier Motoranlage concept could, plus some external mountings, such as an integrally complete exhaust system (including a turbocharger, if fitted as part of the design), as a completely interchangeable unit.  Both M and T formats were also used with various inline engines, like the Daimler-Benz DB 603 used for both the inline-engined versions of the Do 217 and the enormous BV 238 flying boat, and the Junkers Jumo 213 powerplants used for later marks of the Ju 88 multirole aircraft.

The M and T unitized engine formats added secondary designator suffixes, which especially for the 801 radial (and perhaps others), did not always match the letter suffix that designated the bare radial engine used for a particular unitized installation, confusing the naming of the 801 engine series' subtypes considerably. These suffix designators initially referred to these complete kits and their "bare" engine counterparts almost interchangeably. The A, B and L models were known (logically) as Motoranlage style MA, MB and ML engines in this form, but the common D-2 was instead known as the MG. As the war wore on the confusion increased, the E model was delivered as the Triebwerksanlage style TG or TH, seemingly suggesting a relation to the G and H engines, but in fact those were delivered as the TL and TP. It is rather common to see the turbocharged versions referred to only with the T for the more completely unitized Triebwerksanlage installations, notably the (most notoriously of all) TJ for the BMW 801J turbocharged radial subtype, and the TQ models, further confusing the issue.

Variants
BMW 801 A, C, L (B)
1,560 PS (1,539 hp, 1,147 kW)
BMW 801 D-2, Q-2, G-2, (H-2)
1,700 PS (1,677 hp, 1,250 kW)
BMW 801 E,S
2,000 PS (1,973 hp, 1,471 kW)
BMW 801 F
2,400 PS (2,367 hp, 1,765 kW), development halted by the end of the war

Applications
Blohm & Voss BV 141
Blohm & Voss BV 144
Dornier Do 217
Focke-Wulf Fw 190
Focke-Wulf Fw 191
Heinkel He 277 (as designed for Amerikabomber role)
Junkers Ju 88
Junkers Ju 188
Junkers Ju 288 (as temporary fitment, in place of intended Jumo 222 engines)
Junkers Ju 388
Junkers Ju 290
Junkers Ju 390
Messerschmitt Me 264 (replacing original Jumo 211 fitment)

Specifications (BMW 801 C)

See also

References

Notes

Bibliography

External links

 Technical drawing of a BMW 801A in high resolution
 Technical drawing of a BMW 801D in high resolution
 Engine run of a BMW 801 in 2010

Aircraft air-cooled radial piston engines
BMW aircraft engines
1930s aircraft piston engines